The following lists events that happened during 1872 in Chile.

Incumbents
President of Chile: Federico Errázuriz Zañartu

Events 
date unknown - The shipping company CSAV is founded.
date unknown - Recaredo Santos Tornero published in Paris Chile Ilustrado. First illustrated album of the country.

Births
6 December - Ramón Briones Luco (d. 1949)

Deaths
4 May - Manuel García Banqueda (b. 1803)
December - José Domingo Bezanilla (b. 1788)

References 

 
Years of the 19th century in Chile
Chile